Qarah Gozlu (also Romanized as Qarah Gozlū; also known as Qaraguzlu, Qareh Gowzlū, Shamsābād-e Qareh Gozlū, and Shamsābād-e Qoroq) is a village in Beyza Rural District, Beyza District, Sepidan County, Fars Province, Iran. At the 2006 census, its population was 366, in 83 families.

References 

Populated places in Beyza County